RCA Studio B was a music recording studio built in 1956 in Nashville, Tennessee by RCA Victor. Originally known simply as "RCA Studios," Studio B, along with the larger and later RCA Studio A became known in the 1960s for being an essential factor to the development of the musical production style and sound engineering technique known as the Nashville Sound. In the two decades the studio was in operation, RCA Studio B produced 60 percent of the Billboard magazine's Country chart hits. The studio closed in 1977.

The studio is located centrally in the Nashville's historic Music Row district. Since 1992 the studio has been under the ownership of the Country Music Hall of Fame, which offers scheduled tours of the facilities.

Early history
After years of using portable equipment to record projects in various recording facilities around Nashville, in 1954 Steve Sholes and Chet Atkins established RCA Victor's first Nashville recording facility within the Methodist Television Radio & Film Commission building at 1525 McGavock Street. In January, 1956, Sholes and Atkins produced a session with Elvis Presley, during which he recorded the song Heartbreak Hotel that would become his first gold record and the biggest-selling single of 1956.

Studio
Business offices resided in the single-story front of the building, with studio facilities in the rear. A grand piano, acquired from  NBC's Tonight Starring Steve Allen, sat in the corner. An echo chamber occupied the second story.

In March, 1959, Bill Porter replaced Bob Ferris, RCA Studio B's first chief engineer, and by June had mixed a number one hit: "The Three Bells" by The Browns. Porter considered the studio's acoustics problematic, with resonant room modes creating an uneven frequency response. To lessen the problem, he took some $60 from the studio's petty cash and bought fiberglass acoustic ceiling panels which he cut into triangles and hung from the ceiling at varying heights; these were dubbed "Porter Pyramids". Porter also marked "X"es on the floor where he discovered, by careful experimentation, the resonant modes to be minimal. Porter positioned lead vocalists, background vocalists, and acoustic guitarists at microphones placed directly over his marks. After these improvements, Don Gibson recorded his album Girls, Guitars and Gibson in the studio. Porter later told an interviewer: "Everybody said, 'God, what a different sound!

Porter also preferred the luminous echo of the studio's EMT 140 plate reverb rather than its echo chamber, keeping the plates chilled in the air conditioned room to brighten their sound.

In 1960 and 1961, an addition was built to provide office space and rooms for tape mastering and a lacquer mastering lab.

Nashville painter and singer/songwriter Gil Veda—introduced to the Grand Ole Opry crowd as "The Spanish Hank Williams" in 1962—was the first Hispanic singer to record at RCA's Studio B.

In her 1994 memoir, My Life And Other Unfinished Business, Dolly Parton recounted how she was rushing to her first recording session at Studio B in October 1967 (shortly after having signed with RCA Victor) and, in her haste to make the session on time, drove her car through the side wall of the building. She noted that the spot where her car impacted the building is still visible.

Production style

Quonset Hut Studio, RCA Studio B, and later RCA Studio A, were essential locations to the development of the "Nashville Sound." Chet Atkins and the production team at RCA Studio B, notably Steve Sholes, Owen Bradley, Bob Ferguson, and Bill Porter produced studio recordings in the Nashville Sound style, a sophisticated style characterized by background vocals and strings. The Nashville Sound both revived the popularity of country music and helped establish Nashville's reputation as an international recording center, with these three studios at the center of what would become known as Music Row.

Historic landmark
In 1977, the studio was made available to the Country Music Hall of Fame for tours, and in 1992 it was donated to the Country Music Hall of Fame by the late Dan Maddox. Until 2001, it was operated as an attraction when the new home for the Hall of Fame was built in downtown Nashville. From 2001 to 2011 the studio was co-operated by the Country Music Hall of Fame and Belmont University's Mike Curb College of Entertainment and Music Business program, which utilized the studio to teach students basic techniques of analog recording.

In 2012, the National Park Service listed RCA Studio B on the National Register of Historic Places. The same year, operation shifted solely to the Country Music Hall of Fame and Museum, which offers daily scheduled tours of the studio.

List of notable artists recorded
More than 47,000 songs were recorded at RCA Studio B, many by legendary music artists. Elvis Presley is known to have recorded more than two hundred songs at this location.

Following is a list of some notable artists who recorded songs at Studio B.

 Eddy Arnold
 Chet Atkins
 Bobby Bare
 David Bowie
 Harold Bradley
 The Browns
 Jerry Byrd
 Floyd Cramer
 Skeeter Davis
 Dottsy
 Ronnie Dove
 The Everly Brothers
 Donna Fargo
 Connie Francis
 Hank Garland
 Don Gibson
 Mickey Gilley
 Bobby Goldsboro
 Billy Grammer
 Buddy Harman
 John Hartford
 Al Hirt
 Homer and Jethro
 Norma Jean
 Waylon Jennings
 Jack Jersey
 Grandpa Jones
 The Jordanaires
 Anita Kerr Singers
 Hank Locklin
 John D. Loudermilk
 Bob Luman
 Charlie McCoy
 Roger Miller
 Bob Moore
 Willie Nelson
 Notre Dame High School (Elmira, New York)
 Roy Orbison
 Dolly Parton
 Elvis Presley
 Charley Pride
 Boots Randolph
 Jim Reeves
 Tommy Roe
 Ronny & the Daytonas
 Samuelsons
 Connie Smith
 Hank Snow
 Gary Stewart
 The Strokes
 Nat Stuckey
 Sue Thompson
 Johnny Tillotson
 Ernest Tubb
 The Velvets
 Porter Wagoner
 Gillian Welch
 Dottie West

 Country Johnny Mathis

References

External links

 Official website

Recording studios in Tennessee
Buildings and structures in Nashville, Tennessee
Culture of Nashville, Tennessee
RCA Records
Country Music Hall of Fame and Museum